Great Britain and Northern Ireland (often referred to as Great Britain) is competing at the 2009 World Championships in Athletics from 15–23 August. UK Athletics announced a team of 60 athletes in July in preparation for the competition, although it was known that some athletes might not compete due to injury. Christine Ohuruogu entered the competition as the defending 400 metres champion. Selected athletes had achieved one of the competition's qualifying standards.

Ohuruogu, Jessica Ennis, and Phillips Idowu were identified as the athletes with the greatest chance of winning a gold medal; two of them succeeded. The team included the defending 400m gold and silver medallists, Ohuruogu and Nicola Sanders, respectively. Paula Radcliffe, the Marathon gold medallist in 2005, was the other individual medallist returning to the GBR team. Head coach Charles van Commenee stated that matching the last championships medal haul (5) was a reasonable target given a number of high-profile injuries.

Germaine Mason and Toby Sandeman withdrew from the squad due to injuries before the start of the competition.

Team selection

Track and road events

Field and combined events

Results

Men
Track and field events

Women
Track, field and road events

Footnotes

References

External links
Official competition website

Nations at the 2009 World Championships in Athletics
World Championships in Athletics
Athletics in the United Kingdom
Great Britain and Northern Ireland at the World Championships in Athletics
2009 in Northern Ireland sport
Athletics in Northern Ireland